The 2002 Cincinnati Bengals season was the franchise's 33rd season in the National Football League, the 35th overall, and the second and final full season under head coach Dick LeBeau.  With a record of 2–14, however, they were the worst team in football in 2002. The team's struggles continued as they lost their first seven contests losing by an average of 19 points in each game. The Bengals would finally garner their first victory Week 8 by soundly defeating the expansion Houston Texans on the road 38–3. The winning would not last long, however, as the Bengals lost their next six games to fall to 1–13, this lethargic result was later matched by the 2019 team, which also finished at 2–14.

In their final game at home, the Bengals would stun the New Orleans Saints 20–13 to earn their second win on the season, but there would be no saving the Bengals from setting a new franchise record for losses as they finished the season with a 27–9 loss to the Buffalo Bills on the road to finish with a league-worst 2–14 record. This resulted in the Bengals owner Mike Brown firing head coach Dick LeBeau and replacing him with Washington's defensive coordinator Marvin Lewis.

By being the worst team in 2002, they earned the first pick in the 2003 NFL Draft, which they would use to draft Heisman Trophy winning quarterback Carson Palmer out of USC, and releasing embattled quarterback Akili Smith.

Offseason

NFL Draft

Undrafted free agents

Personnel

Roster

Regular season

Schedule

Note: Intra-divisional opponents are in bold text

Game summaries

Week 3: at Atlanta Falcons

Week 17: at Buffalo Bills

Standings

Team leaders

Passing

Rushing

Receiving

Defensive

Kicking and punting

Special teams

Awards and records

Pro Bowl Selections
 Lorenzo Neal FB, AFC Pro-Bowl Selection

Milestones
 Corey Dillon, 6th 1,000 yard rushing (1,311 yards) season

References

External links
 
 2002 Cincinnati Bengals at Pro-Football-Reference.com

Cincinnati Bengals
Cincinnati Bengals seasons
Cincin